Constance Mantey (born 31 August 1976) is a Ghanaian former international footballer who played as a goalkeeper.

Career
Mantey has played club football for Asante Kotoko and Goldfields Obuasi.

He also played at international level for  Ghana, earning two caps in 2000, and was a squad member at the African Cup of Nations in 1998 and 2000.

References

1976 births
Living people
Ghanaian footballers
Ghana international footballers
1998 African Cup of Nations players
2000 African Cup of Nations players
Asante Kotoko S.C. players
Association football goalkeepers